No flats may refer to:
C major, a major musical key with no flats
A minor, a minor musical key with no flats